is a Japanese light novel series written by Akumi Agitogi and illustrated by Tsukiho Tsukioka. Initially published online via the user-generated novel publishing website Shōsetsuka ni Narō, it was later acquired by Fujimi Shobo, who has released the series since January 2019 under their Fujimi L Bunko imprint.

A manga adaptation illustrated by Rito Kohsaka has been serialized in Square Enix's Gangan Online service since December 2018. A live-action film adaptation premiered in Japan in March 2023, followed by an anime television series by Kinema Citrus premiering in July.

Synopsis
Taking place in the 19th century Meiji Restoration era, Miyo Saimori, who is born without supernatural talent, is forced into an existence of servitude by her abusive stepmother. When Miyo finally comes of marriageable age, though, her hopes of being whisked away to a better life crumble after she discovers her fiancé’s identity: Kiyoka Kudou, a commander apparently so cold and cruel that his previous would-be brides all fled within three days of their engagements. With no home to return to, Miyo resigns herself to her fate—and soon finds that her pale and beautiful husband-to-be is anything but the monster she expected. As they slowly open their hearts to each other, both realize the other may be their chance at finding true love and happiness.

Characters

Miyo is the eldest daughter of family with supernatural talent, the Saimori. She is 19 years old. Born without supernatural talent, she was treated like a servant by her stepmother and younger sister and even her own biological father deemed her useless. She was married off to Kiyoka Kudo, a "ruthless soldier" and the head of famous Kudo family just so she could be "at least useful" to the Saimori. 

The head of the Kudo family. He is described as a "ruthless soldier"; anyone who becomes his fiancee flees after only 3 days. He is pyrokinetic.

Media

Light novels
Written by Akumi Agitogi, My Happy Marriage began publication online via the user-generated novel publishing website Shōsetsuka ni Narō. The series was later acquired by Fujimi Shobo, who began publishing the novels with illustrations by Tsukiho Tsukioka on January 15, 2019, under their Fujimi L Bunko imprint. As of July 2022, six volumes have been released. Yen Press is publishing the novels in English.

Manga
A manga adaptation illustrated by Rito Kohsaka began serialization online via Square Enix's Gangan Online service on December 20, 2018. As of November 2022, four tankōbon volumes have been released. In North America, Square Enix has licensed the manga for English publication.

Live-action film
A live-action film adaptation was announced on April 25, 2022. It is directed by Ayuko Tsukahara, based on a script written by Tomoe Kanno. The film premiered in Japan on March 17, 2023. Idol group Snow Man performed the theme song titled .

Anime
An anime adaptation was announced on April 5, 2022. It was later revealed to be a television series produced by Kinema Citrus and directed by Takehiro Kubota, with supervision and storyboards handled by Takao Abo, scripts written by Ami Satō, Takahito Ōnishi and Momoka Toyoda, character designs by Shōko Yasuda, and music composed by Evan Call. The series is set to premiere in Japan in July 2023. Netflix will stream the series.

Reception
In 2020, the manga adaptation ranked eighth in the sixth Next Manga Awards in the web manga category. It ranked sixth in the 2021 edition of Takarajimasha's Kono Manga ga Sugoi! list of best manga for female readers. The manga ranked first in the "Nationwide Bookstore Employees' Recommended Comics of 2021" list by Japanese bookstore Honya Club. In 2022, the manga was nominated for the best shōjo manga at the 46th Kodansha Manga Award. It ranked 29th on the 2022 "Book of the Year" list by Da Vinci magazine.

See also
 Book Girl and the Suicidal Mime and Book Girl and the Famished Spirit, Japanese manga series illustrated by Rito Kohsaka
 Gloomy the Naughty Grizzly, a Japanese anime television series directed by Takehiro Kubota
 Sand Chronicles, Twin Spica, Limit, Jūhan Shuttai!, Unnatural, Chūgakusei Nikki and The Good Wife, Japanese television drama series directed by Ayuko Tsukahara
 Cafe Funiculi Funicula, a Japanese film directed by Ayuko Tsukahara
 Time Traveller: The Girl Who Leapt Through Time, Girl in the Sunny Place, La La La at Rock Bottom, The Asadas and The Door into Summer, Japanese films with a script written by Tomoe Kanno

References

External links
  
  
  
  
 

2019 Japanese novels
Anime and manga based on light novels
Fantasy anime and manga
Fujimi L Bunko
Gangan Comics manga
Japanese fantasy novels
Japanese novels adapted into films
Japanese webcomics
Kadokawa Dwango franchises
Kinema Citrus
Light novels
Light novels first published online
Netflix original anime
Shōjo manga
Shōsetsuka ni Narō
Upcoming Netflix original programming
Webcomics in print
Yen Press titles